Gladice Georgina Keevil (later  Mrs Rickford; 1884 – 1959) was a British suffragette who served as head of the Midlands office of the Women's Social and Political Union between 1908 and 1910.

Early life 
Gladice was born and had her childhood at Clitterhouse Farm in Cricklewood. She was educated at the Cricklewood  Kindergarten (where she won a prize for clay modelling in 1891) and Cricklewood High School, the Frances Buss School in Camden, and the Lambeth School of Art. She worked as a governess in France and the USA before returning to Britain in 1907. She married in 1913, becoming Mrs. Rickford.

Involvement in the Women's Suffrage Movement   
After joining the WSPU in September 1907, Gladice was employed as the head of the Midlands as a National Organiser in 1908. She opened a WSPU Midlands headquarters in Birmingham where she worked with Bertha Ryland and Laura Ainsworth. She  was campaigning at the Bury St Edmunds by-election (1907) with Rachel Barrett, Nellie Martel, Emmeline Pankhurst, Aeta Lamb and Elsa Gye, organised the campaign during the Wolverhampton by-election in 1908. She was a key speaker at demonstrations in support of women's suffrage in Heaton Park (July 1908) Hyde Park (1908) and Belfast (1910).

Arrest in 1908 

Gladice was one of twelve women who was arrested after walking single file through the streets towards the houses of commons with Mrs. Pankhurst in February 1908 "to present a petition from the Conference at Caxton Hall, and to the refusal of the authorities to treat suffragist offenders as first-class misdemeanants." Gladice was arrested along with Mrs Pankhurst and others and was charged with resisting and obstructing the police.

Recognition

In 1910 Keevil was invited to stay at Eagle House in Bathampton, Somerset where a tree was planted in her honour. Many significant women from the suffragette movement were invited to stay at Mary Blathwayt's parents' home and to plant a tree to recover from and celebrate a prison sentence. The trees were known as "Annie's Arboreatum" after Annie Kenney. Gladice was invited to Eagle House several times. Mary's mother thought her one of the nicer suffragettes. The Blathwayt's fell out with the movement when politician's were assaulted. The WSPU movement split over the authority demanded by Emmeline and Christabel Pankhurst and their increasing demands for extremism. and Keevil is thought to have left in about 1911. Keevil married in 1913 and went to live in Burpham in the 1940s where she brought up three sons. She died in 1959.

References 

1884 births
1959 deaths
English suffragists
Eagle House suffragettes
Women's Social and Political Union